Tiger parrots are members of the genus Psittacella (the only genus in the subfamily  Psittacellinae) in the family Psittaculidae, named for their tiger-striped backs. Established by Hermann Schlegel in 1871, the genus contains the following species, all of which are endemic to the island of New Guinea.
 Madarasz's tiger parrot (Psittacella madaraszi)
 Modest tiger parrot (Psittacella modesta)
 Painted tiger parrot (Psittacella picta)
 Brehm's tiger parrot (Psittacella brehmii)

The Brehm's tiger parrot is a small, green colored parrot, and is the largest species in the "Psittacella" genus. It measures to be around 24cm in length and weighs between 94 and 120g. Their diet consists primarily of seeds and berries.

References

Joseph, L., Toon, A., Schirtzinger, E. E., Wright, T. F., & Schodde, R. (2012). A revised nomenclature and classification for family-group taxa of parrots (Psittaciformes). Zootaxa, 26-40.

 
 
Taxonomy articles created by Polbot